Emerald City is a duet studio album by guitarist John Abercrombie and pianist Richie Beirach. The album was released on via Pathfinder Records in 1987 to modest critical success. The album was re-released on CD in 1994 by Evidence label.

Reception
Ron Wynn of AllMusic wrote "Depending on how you choose to define "jazz," this duet session linking pianist Richie Beirach with John Abercrombie (playing guitar synthesizer) may or may not fit your criteria. There are certainly passages with a rock sensibility, and Abercrombie's use of a guitar synthesizer may distress those who instinctively distrust electronics in any improvising context. But if you rank jazz pedigree on skills, individuality, and the willingness to take chances, then this date qualifies on all counts".

Track listing

Personnel
John Abercrombie – guitar, synthesizer, producer
Richie Beirach – piano, producer

References

John Abercrombie (guitarist) albums
1987 albums
Richie Beirach albums